This is a list of awards and nominations received by South Korean singer and actress Bae Suzy.

She was the first female celebrity to win a rookie award in all three fields of music, television and movies, and the youngest recipient of a Style Icon Asia award.



Awards and nominations

Other accolades

Listicles

See also 
List of awards and nominations received by Miss A

References 

Bae Suzy